Bülent Akın (born 28 August 1978) is a Belgian-born Turkish former footballer.

Club career
Akin's potential was noticed after Galatasaray legend Gheorghe Hagi remarked on how well the young midfielder had marked him in a match between Galatasaray and Akin's club, Denizilispor. Galatasaray subsequently signed Akin, but he failed to live up to the expectation. Nonetheless, he managed to win the UEFA Super Cup in 2000 with the club.

In July 2002 he joined English side Bolton Wanderers. He made his debut in a League Cup defeat to Bury, a game in which he was sent off. He made one appearance for Bolton in the league; a 2-0 defeat to Aston Villa on 1 January 2003. He was released by Bolton in April 2003.

International career
Born in Belgium to Turkish parents, Bülent was a youth international for Turkey.

Honours
Galatasaray
 Süper Lig: 2001–02
 UEFA Super Cup: 2000

References

External links
Soccerbase profile

1978 births
Living people
Footballers from Brussels
Turkish footballers
Turkey youth international footballers
Belgian footballers
Belgian people of Turkish descent
Turkish expatriate footballers
Turkish expatriate sportspeople in England
Bolton Wanderers F.C. players
Denizlispor footballers
Expatriate footballers in England
Expatriate footballers in the Netherlands
Association football midfielders
Galatasaray S.K. footballers
Gençlerbirliği S.K. footballers
Malatyaspor footballers
İstanbulspor footballers
MVV Maastricht players
Premier League players
R.S.C. Anderlecht players
Süper Lig players
Eerste Divisie players
Turkey under-21 international footballers
Yeni Malatyaspor footballers